Kayla Becker (born June 7, 1991) is an American sports broadcaster. She is signed to WWE, where she appears under the ring name Kayla Braxton.

Early life 
Becker was born in Wadley, Alabama, on June 7, 1991. She is biracial. When she was nine years old, her mother was sent to prison; she subsequently grew up in a foster home. As a teenager, she participated in public speaking competitions. She graduated from Belmont University with a degree in broadcast journalism. During her time in college, she started creating online content and had a few digital entertainment shows for her school and around Nashville, Tennessee. Six months after she graduated, she began hosting her own entertainment web and TV segment in the top-20 television market in Orlando, Florida.

Career 
In October 2016, Becker signed with the American professional wrestling promotion WWE and was given the ring name Kayla Braxton. She debuted on the October 20, 2016 episode of NXT held in Lakeland, Florida as a host and ring announcer. She appeared on her first pay-per-view as a backstage interviewer during Backlash on May 21, 2017, and followed it up with appearances at Battleground 2017, SummerSlam 2017, Hell in a Cell 2017, and more PPVs. While working as a ring announcer on NXT, Braxton appeared on Raw, 205 Live and SmackDown where she would act as a ring announcer and backstage interviewer. She permanently left NXT on August 17, 2019, to the main roster and was replaced by Alicia Taylor the following week. Braxton is currently a backstage interviewer on SmackDown and co-host of The Bump. Since August 22, 2020, she has been the host of Talking Smack alongside Paul Heyman.

Personal life 
On March 4, 2021, Becker announced that she is bisexual.

References

External links 
 
 

American sports announcers
Living people
Professional wrestling announcers
Sportspeople from Alabama
Belmont University alumni
African-American people
American LGBT sportspeople
1991 births